The Blue Villa (fr: "Villa Bleue") is a historic mansion in Barcelonnette, Alpes-de-Haute-Provence, Provence-Alpes-Côte d'Azur, France. It was built from 1929 to 1931 for Camille Jean, a French businessman who founded Francia Maritima, a store in Mexico City, Mexico. It was designed in Art Deco style by Joseph Hiriart, Georges Tribout and Georges Beau. It has been listed as an official historical monument since 1987.

References

Houses completed in 1931
Art Deco architecture in France
Monuments historiques of Provence-Alpes-Côte d'Azur
20th-century architecture in France